Julian Gölles (born 22 September 1999) is an Austrian footballer who plays as a defender for FC Blau-Weiß Linz.

Club career
On 23 June 2021, he joined FC Blau-Weiß Linz on a two-year contract.

References

Living people
1999 births
Austrian footballers
Austria youth international footballers
Austria under-21 international footballers
Association football defenders
FC Liefering players
SC Wiener Neustadt players
WSG Tirol players
FC Blau-Weiß Linz players
Austrian Football Bundesliga players
2. Liga (Austria) players